Manuel Ferriol Martínez (born 13 August 1998) is a Spanish footballer who plays as a midfielder.

Career

Youth, College & Amateur
Ferriol played as part of the Levante academy from 2010 to 2016, before moving to the United States to play college soccer at James Madison University in Harrisonburg, Virginia. At James Madison, Ferriol made 64 appearances, scoring 32 goals and tallying 11 assists. In his senior year with the Dukes, Ferriol won accolades such as CAA Player of the Year, All-CAA First Team, ECAC Offensive Player of the Year, USC All-Atlantic Region First Team As a junior he was named USC All-Atlantic Region First Team, Most Outstanding Player of the CAA Tournament and was All-CAA Second Team. In his sophomore year he was All-CAA First Team.

In his senior college year, Ferriol also played with USL League Two side Long Island Rough Riders, scoring 5 goals and tallying 4 assists in 12 games for them.

MLS SuperDraft
On 9 January 2020, Ferriol was selected 40th overall in the 2020 MLS SuperDraft by FC Dallas. However, he was not signed by the club.

FC Tucson
On 27 February 2020, Ferriol signed with FC Tucson of USL League One. He made his league debut for the club on 12 September 2020, appearing as a 79th-minute substitute during a 2–0 loss to North Texas SC.

References

External links
Manuel Ferriol - Men's Soccer at James Madison University
Manuel Ferriol at FC Tucson
Manuel Ferriol at MLS

1998 births
Living people
Association football midfielders
Spanish footballers
Spanish expatriate footballers
Spanish expatriate sportspeople in the United States
Expatriate soccer players in the United States
Levante UD footballers
James Madison Dukes men's soccer players
Long Island Rough Riders players
National Premier Soccer League players
FC Tucson players
FC Dallas draft picks
USL League One players
USL League Two players